ExtremeXOS is the software or the network operating system used in newer Extreme Networks network switches. It is Extreme Networks second generation operating system after the VxWorks based ExtremeWare operating system.

ExtremeXOS is based on the Linux kernel and BusyBox.  In July 2008 legal action was taken against Extreme Networks due to alleged violation of the GNU General Public License.  Three months later the lawsuit was settled out of court.

References 

Linux-based devices
Embedded Linux
Network operating systems